McKusick may refer to:

People with the surname McKusick:
James C. McKusick, author of Green Writing: Romanticism and Ecology
Marshall Kirk McKusick, computer scientist, brother of James C. McKusick
Victor A. McKusick, pioneering medical geneticist, twin brother of Vincent McKusick
Vincent L. McKusick, Chief Justice of Maine, twin brother of Victor McKusick

See also
Lake McKusick, a lake in Minnesota
Carroll L. McKusick Elementary School, Guilford, Maine, named for father of Victor and Vincent McKusick
The University of South Dakota's McKusick Law Library